Lokmanya Tilak High School (often abbreviated as LTHS or LTES), is an English medium school located in Tilak Nagar, Chembur in Mumbai, India. It began operating in 1967, drawing its students mainly from middle-class families in the area around Tilak Nagar. A semi-government School, it is owned by Tilak Nagar Education Society and managed by the Government of Maharashtra  and it is affiliated to Maharashtra SSC Board.  The school is named after Bal Gangadhar Tilak (1856–1920).

Campus
The school building has two floors. The ground floor consists of 8 classrooms and Primary school Principal office. It also contains the Secondary Principals' cabin and an office with around four class rooms. In addition, it includes a Science laboratory, a Computer lab, and a library.

The second floor is made out of seven class rooms, three of which have been built recently. Playgrounds are not present within the school because of space limitations, but it does have a long jump pit and high jump has been played in premises as well;  the adjacent Municipal Ground is used for sports and the Annual Sports Day activities. The Tilak Nagar police station is adjacent to the school premises.

SSC curriculum
Subjects taught include English as a First Language, Marathi as a Second Language, Hindi, Sanskrit, History, Geography, Algebra, Geometry, and Science.

Activities
The school organizes Annual Day, Annual Sports Day, and sports events. Students represent the school in inter-school activities including sports, drawing competitions, elocution and essay writing competitions, dance, quiz competitions, and Scouting & Guiding.

The School Alumni team organized a Golden Jubilee Celebration called '"SWARNARPAN"' in 2016 inviting the alumni's Primary and Secondary School teachers.

Motto
The school motto; "Learning leads to light" refers to enlightening the darkness in society through the medium of education.

Other schools
 Adarsha Vidyalaya
 Amchi Shala
 Chembur Karnatak High School
 General Education Academy
 Holy Family High School
 Our Lady of Perpetual Succour High School
 Saraswati Vidya Mandir

See also
 List of schools in Mumbai

References

Educational institutions established in 1967
1967 establishments in Maharashtra
Schools in Chembur
High schools and secondary schools in Mumbai
Memorials to Bal Gangadhar Tilak